Lost Time is a 2002 album by indie rock band 12 Rods. It was the band's fourth, and final, full-length album.

Track listing
 "Universal Time" – 1:15
 "Fake Magic 8-ball" – 3:38
 "24 Hours Ago" – 4:02
 "One Thing Does Not Belong" – 3:06
 "Boy In The Woods" – 3:48
 "Summertime Vertigo" – 4:37
 "Accidents Waiting To Happen" – 4:00
 "Terrible Hands" – 3:36
 "The Time Is Right (To Be Wrong)" – 3:30
 "Lost/Found" – 2:29
 "Telephone Holiday" – 4:41

2002 albums
12 Rods albums